Kyondoe is a town located within the Kawkareik District of Kayin State, Myanmar. It is located on the India–Myanmar–Thailand Trilateral Highway and eastern bank of Haungtharaw River.

References 

Populated places in Kayin State